Adrian Ivaniţchi (born September 15, 1947) is a Romanian folk musician and guitarist. He was one of the founding members of Coral, one of the first Romanian beat music groups. He played with several popular Romanian pop/rock groups in the 1960s, including Sideral and Sfinx.

In his hometown, Sighişoara, he started 2 bands, called Melody and Tarabostes in the late 1960- early 1970s. In 1982 he started a band called Bastion.

He was a founding member of the Agora poetry and music circle in Sighişoara in the 1970s. Chief organizer of the Sighişoara Folk Festival held in 1974.

Director of the Inter-ethnic Youth Center in Sighişoara, and one of the organizers of the ProEtnica festivals held annually in Sighişoara.

In 2002 he issued a CD called Amintirea paradisului.

References

External links

1947 births
Living people
Romanian guitarists
Folk guitarists
Romanian singer-songwriters
People from Sighișoara